Yttrium acetylacetonate is a coordination compound of yttrium, with the chemical formula of Y(C5H7O2)3, or Y(acac)3 for short. Its instability constants (logYn) are 2.08, 3.81 and 4.98 (n=1, 2, 3). It can be prepared by the reaction of trialkoxyyttrium or tris[bis(trimethylsilyl) amino]yttrium and acetylacetone. It thermally decomposes to form yttrium oxide.

References 

Yttrium compounds
Acetylacetonate complexes